"Hello in There" is a song written by American singer-songwriter John Prine. The song deals with themes of isolation as a result of growing old.

Background
Prine wrote the song when he was 22, stating: "I delivered to a Baptist old people’s home where we’d have to go room-to-room... and some of the patients would kind of pretend that you were a grandchild or nephew that had come to visit, instead of the guy delivering papers. That always stuck in my head." Prine also went on to state that some of the names of the characters in the song come from real-life sources, such as Rudy being the name of a neighbor's dog.

Other Versions
In 2020, Jason Isbell covered the song for the Alzheimer’s Association’s Music Moments compilation. According to Isbell, John Prine is one of his favorite songwriters.

The Hello in There Foundation
After John Prine's death from COVID-19 in 2020, Prine's family established the Hello in There Foundation. While also honoring Prine himself, the foundation aims to support marginalized groups and persons.

References

1971 songs
John Prine songs
Songs written by John Prine
Songs about old age